Michelle Holder is an American economist who is an Associate Professor of Economics at John Jay College of Criminal Justice in the City University of New York. Her research focuses on discrimination in the workplace and wage gaps between white men and other groups in the United States. In June 2021, she was named president and CEO of The Washington Center for Equitable Growth.

Early life and education 
Holder was born and raised in New York City. She earned her bachelor's degree a degree in economics from Fordham University, her master's degree in Public Administration from the University of Michigan's Gerald R. Ford School of Public Policy, and M.A. and PhD in economics from The New School for Social Research, where she was one of several student-employee protégés of New School and later State of California administrator M. Elizabeth Ware.

Career 
Holder served as a labor market analyst for the Community Service Society of New York, a research associate for The New School for Social Research, the finance director for Dēmos, and an economist for Office of the State Deputy Comptroller for New York City.

Holder has testified before the U.S. congress several times, on topics ranging from the care economy, the racial and gender wage gap, manufacturing and green energy, and the strength of the economic recovery in the wake of the pandemic. She has also published numerous reports. In March 2020 Holder authored "The ‘Double Gap’ and the Bottom Line: African American Women's Wage Gap and Corporate Profits."

In March 2021 Holder published a research article in Feminist Economics, titled "The Early Impact of COVID-19 on Job Losses Among Black Women in the U.S."

Holder has been featured in The New York Times, The Washington Post, The Atlantic, The New Yorker, The Financial Times, Fortune, Vox, MSNBC, NPR, PBS, and CNN. On April 5, 2022, Holder was quoted in the New York Times article "The U.S. Economy Is Booming. So Why Are Economists Worrying About a Recession?" On January 13, 2022, Holder was quoted in the Marketplace article "Why the economic recovery looks different for women of color.” In 2020, Fortune magazine named her one of 19 Black economists to watch.

Holder's op-ed "Build Back Better is in limbo — without its social programs, the economy will be, too," was published in The Hill, where she discussed the importance of government spending in social infrastructure.

She currently is an advisory committee member for the Institute for Women's Policy, and is an advisory board member for the Better Life Lab of New America.

Selected works 
 Holder, Michelle. "African American Men's Decline in Labor Market Status during the Great Recession." In African American Men and the Labor Market during the Great Recession, pp. 35–62. Palgrave Macmillan, New York, 2017.
 Holder, Michelle. "Revisiting Bergmann's occupational crowding model." Review of Radical Political Economics 50, no. 4 (2018): 683–690.
 Holder, Michelle, Janelle Jones, and Thomas Masterson. "The early impact of covid-19 on job losses among Black Women in the United States." Feminist Economics 27, no. 1-2 (2021): 103–116.
 Holder, Michelle, and Alan A. Aja. Afro-Latinos in the US Economy. Rowman & Littlefield, 2021.

References

External links 
Michelle Holder on Twitter

African-American economists
Fordham University alumni
American women economists
Living people
The New School alumni
Year of birth missing (living people)
21st-century African-American people
21st-century African-American women